is a Japanese football player.

Playing career
Yamazaki was born in Saitama Prefecture on December 30, 1995. After graduating from Meiji University, he joined J2 League club Ehime FC in 2018.

References

External links

1995 births
Living people
Meiji University alumni
Association football people from Saitama Prefecture
Japanese footballers
J2 League players
Ehime FC players
Association football defenders